For the felony murder rule in all U.S. jurisdictions, see felony murder rule.

In the state of Vermont the common law felony murder rule is codified at 13 V.S.A. § 2301. This rule provides that anyone who kills another person while committing or attempting to commit an arson, sexual assault, aggravated sexual assault, robbery or burglary, shall be guilty of first degree murder. Every other factor not provided in this statute is murder in the second degree.

References

U.S. state criminal law
Vermont law